"Ami Ami" is the 1985 debut single of Belgian singer Sandra Kim.

In 1985, as a member of Musiclub, Kim competed at the "L'ambrogino d'oro" festival in Milan with "Ami Ami" and placing fourth. The song peaked at #14 on the Belgian charts.

Music video 
In the music video Kim is singing and dancing in front of an artificial blue, orange and red background.

Versions 
In the vinyl characteristics, it has the same song but in two languages, Italian and French (original version).

References 

French pop songs
Sandra Kim songs
1985 singles
1985 songs